Lorcán McLoughlin (born 14 November 1989) is an Irish hurler who plays as a midfielder for club side Kanturk and is a former member of the Cork senior hurling team.

Early life

McLoughlin was born in Kanturk, County Cork. His brother, John McLoughlin, has played Gaelic football for the Cork senior team.

Playing career

Coláiste Treasa

In 2008 McLoughlin helped Coláiste Treasa to the Munster and All-Ireland vocational schools championships. In the All-Ireland semi-final McLoughlin recorded a personal tally of 2–10 in Coláiste Treasa's defeat of Bridgetown Vocational School.

Kanturk

McLoughlin joined the Kanturk club at a young age and played in all grades at juvenile and underage levels as a dual player. In 2009 he was a player with the Kanturk junior football team that defeated Rockchapel to win the Duhallow JAFC title. The Same year he won a Cork Under-21 Hurling Championship with divisional side Duhallow after a 0-18 to 1-05 defeat of Ballinhassig that gave McLoughlin a Under-21 championship medal. He won a second divisional title in 2011 after another defeat of Rockchapel in the final. On 11 November 2011, McLoughlin won a Cork Junior Championship medal following a 1-20 to 0-04 defeat of Mitchelstown in the final. He ended the game as man of the match.

On 3 November 2013, McLoughlin was at midfield when the Kanturk hurlers faced Éire Óg in the final of the Cork Intermediate Championship. He scored eleven points, including three frees and two 65s, in the 2-22 to 1-12 victory.

The 2017-18 season proved to be a hugely successful one for McLoughlin and the Kanturk club. After claiming a Cork Premier Intermediate Championship medal with the hurling team following a two-point defeat of Mallow in the final, he later won a Cork Intermediate Championship medal as a footballer following a 0-14 to 0-13 defeat of Mitchelstown in the final. McLoughlin later won a Munster medal with the hurlers after a 1-23 to 0-25 extra time defeat of Kilmaley. On 4 February 2018, he won an All-Ireland medal after scoring seven points in a 1-18 to 1-17 defeat of St Patrick's Ballyragget in the final.

Cork

Minor and under-21

McLoughlin first played for Cork at minor level in 2007. A dual player with both the hurlers and Gaelic footballers, he won a Munster medal with the Cork minor football team when he was introduced as a blood sub in their 1–16 to 2–8 defeat of Kerry. On 2 September 2007 McLoughlin was at right wing-back when the Cork minor hurling team were defeated by Tipperary in the All-Ireland final.

McLoughlin subsequently joined the Cork under-21 teams as a dual player. After winning a Munster medal as a non-playing substitute with the Cork under-21 football team, McLoughlin was introduced as a substitute in Cork's 1-13 to 2-09 defeat of Down in the All-Ireland final on 4 May 2009.

Intermediate

McLoughlin was selected for the Cork intermediate team and made his debut on 21 June 2009. He later won a Munster medal in 2009 after a defeat of Waterford in the final. On 29 August 2009, McLoughlin won an All-Ireland medal after a 2-23 to 0-16 defeat of Kilkenny.

Senior

McLoughlin made his senior debut for Cork in a National Hurling League defeat of Offaly on 21 February 2010. He was later included on Cork's championship panel.

On 8 September 2013, McLoughlin lined out in his first All-Ireland final against Clare having earlier lost the Munster final to Limerick. Three second-half goals through Conor Lehane, Anthony Nash and Pa Cronin, and a tenth point of the game from Patrick Horgan gave Cork a one-point lead as injury time came to an end. A last-second point from corner-back Domhnall O'Donovan earned Clare a 0–25 to 3–16 draw. The replay on 28 September 2013 saw a hat-trick of goals by Clare's Shane O'Donnell, while further goals from Conor McGrath and Darach Honan secured a 5–16 to 3–16 victory for Clare. 

On 13 July 2014, McLoughlin won his first Munster medal after a six-point defeat of Limerick in the final. 

McLoughlin was a non-playing substitute when he won his second Munster medal following a 1-25 to 1-20 defeat of Clare in the final on 9 July 2017. 

On 1 July 2018, McLoughlin won a third Munster medal after being introduced as a substitute after starting the game on the bench  in Cork's 2-24 to 3-19 second successive defeat of Clare in the final.

McLoughlin announced his retirement from inter-county hurling on 13 November 2018.

Munster

McLoughlin has also been picked for duty with the Munster inter-provincial team, however, he never won a Railway Cup medal.

Career statistics

Club

Division/college

Inter-county

Honours

Team

Coláiste Treasa
All-Ireland Vocational Schools Senior B Hurling Championship (1): 2008
Munster Vocational Schools Senior B Hurling Championship (1): 2008

Kanturk
All-Ireland Intermediate Club Hurling Championship (1): 2018
Munster Intermediate Club Hurling Championship (1): 2017
Cork Premier Intermediate Hurling Championship (1): 2017
Cork Intermediate Football Championship (1): 2017
Cork Intermediate Hurling Championship (1): 2013
Cork Junior Football Championship (1): 2011
Duhallow Junior A Football Championship (2): 2009, 2011

Duhallow
Cork Under-21 Hurling Championship (1): 2009

Cork
Munster Senior Hurling Championship (3): 2014, 2017, 2018
All-Ireland Intermediate Hurling Championship (1): 2009
Munster Intermediate Hurling Championship (1): 2009
All-Ireland Under-21 Football Championship (1): 2009
Munster Under-21 Football Championship (1):  2009
Munster Minor Football Championship (1): 2007

Individual

Awards
96FM/C103 Sports Star of the Month (1): June 2010

References

External links

Lorcán McLoughlin profile at the Cork GAA website

1989 births
Living people
Dual players
Kanturk hurlers
Kanturk Gaelic footballers
Duhallow hurlers
Duhallow Gaelic footballers
CIT hurlers
Cork inter-county Gaelic footballers
Cork inter-county hurlers
Munster inter-provincial hurlers